The Roland Kirk Quartet Meets the Benny Golson Orchestra is an album by jazz multi-instrumentalist Roland Kirk. It was originally released on the Mercury label in November 1963 and contains performances by Kirk's Quartet and Benny Golson's Orchestra.

Reception
The reviewer for Cash Box noted that their playing together "proves to be worthy and natural as the two come up with some first-rate jazz blendings."

Track listing
All compositions by Roland Kirk except as indicated.
 "Ecclusiastics" (Charles Mingus) - 4:27
 "By Myself" (Howard Dietz, Arthur Schwartz) - 4:20
 "Roland Speaks" (Roland Kirk, Benny Golson) - 3:04
 "A Nightingale Sang in Berkeley Square" (Manning Sherwin, Eric Maschwitz) - 5:13
 "Variations on a Theme by Hindemith" - 3:28
 "I've Got Your Number" (Cy Coleman, Carolyn Leigh) - 5:55
 "Between the Fourth and the Fifth Step" - 3:41
 "April Morning" - 3:43
 "Get in the Basement" - 4:03
 "Abstract Improvisation" - 1:58
Recorded in New York on June 11 (tracks 1-5) & June 12 (tracks 6-10), 1963

Personnel
The Roland Kirk Quartet
Roland Kirk - tenor saxophone, manzello, stritch, flute, siren
Harold Mabern - piano (tracks 1-9)
Abdullah Rafik - bass (tracks 6-9)
Sonny Brown - drums (tracks 6-9)
The Benny Golson Orchestra (tracks 1-5)
Benny Golson - conductor, arranger
Richard Williams, Virgil Jones - trumpet
Charles Greenlee, Tom McIntosh - trombone
Don Butterfield - tuba
Richard Davis - bass
Albert Heath - drums

References

1963 albums
Mercury Records albums
Rahsaan Roland Kirk albums
Albums conducted by Benny Golson
Benny Golson albums